Dave Aitel (born 1976) is a computer security professional. He joined the NSA as a research scientist aged 18 where he worked for six years before being employed as a consultant at @stake for three years. In 2002 he founded a security software company, Immunity, where he was the CTO up until December 31, 2020.

Aitel co-authored several books:
 The Hacker's Handbook: The Strategy Behind Breaking into and Defending Networks. 
 The Shellcoder's Handbook. 
 Beginning Python. 

He is also well known for writing several security tools:
 SPIKE, a block-based fuzzer
 SPIKE Proxy, a man-in-the-middle web application assessment tool
 Unmask, a tool to do statistical analysis on text to determine authorship

Dave Aitel is an infrequent guest on the Fox News Channel where he provides commentary on information security news.

References 

Chief technology officers of computer security companies
Living people
1976 births